Ali Jamal Zaghab (born June 3, 1988) is a Jordanian professional basketball player. He plays for Al Riyadi Amman of the Jordanian basketball league. He also is a member of the Jordan national basketball team.

Career
Zaghab debuted for the Jordanian team at the 2010 FIBA World Championship, playing center off the bench for the squad.

References

1988 births
Living people
Centers (basketball)
Jordanian men's basketball players
People from Aqaba
Basketball players at the 2010 Asian Games
Basketball players at the 2014 Asian Games
Power forwards (basketball)
2010 FIBA World Championship players
Asian Games competitors for Jordan